Sanirajak (Inuktitut meaning the shoreline), Syllabics: ᓴᓂᕋᔭᒃ), formerly known as Hall Beach until 27 February 2020, is an Inuit settlement within the Qikiqtaaluk Region of Nunavut, Canada, approximately  south of Igloolik.

History 
It was established in 1957 during the construction of a Distant Early Warning (DEW) site. Currently the settlement is home to a North Warning System radar facility and the Hall Beach Airport.

Demographics 

Geography

Climate 
Sanirajak has a tundra climate (“ET”), a polar climate sub-type under the Köppen climate classification, without the presence of trees, and iced over for most of the year. Summers are very short and cool, with chilly nights. Winters are long and extremely cold, lasting most of the year with little chance of a thaw.

See also 
 List of municipalities in Nunavut
 Charles Francis Hall

References

Further reading 

 McAlpine PJ, and NE Simpson. 1976. "Fertility and Other Demographic Aspects of the Canadian Eskimo Communities of Igloolik and Hall Beach". Human Biology; an International Record of Research. 48, no. 1: 114-38.
 Wenzel, George W. 1997. "Using Harvest Research in Nunavut: An Example from Hall Beach". Arctic Anthropology. 34, no. 1: 18.

Populated places in Arctic Canada
Hamlets in the Qikiqtaaluk Region
Road-inaccessible communities of Nunavut
Spaceports